Water breathing may refer to:
 The natural ability to extract oxygen from water, such as with gills

See also
 Liquid breathing, breathing a specialized oxygenated fluid